Malin (born Malin Reitan; 8 August 1995 in Trondheim, Norway) is a Norwegian singer. She finished 3rd in the Junior Eurovision Song Contest 2005 with her song "Sommer og skolefri". She is also a recording artist with several released albums. Malin sings in her regional dialect.

Biography
Malin's career as a singer started when she was nine years old. She auditioned for the Norwegian selection for JESC 2005, the Melodi Grand Prix Junior 2005, and she was selected to sing among ten contestants in the final show. Her song was too short though, so she had to write one more verse for it on the way home from the audition. After surprising herself by winning MGP Jr by a landslide, she went on a summer concert tour, singing at festivals and on television shows. In November, she performed in the JESC 2005 in Hasselt, Belgium and finished 3rd, the best position for Norway so far.

The following year, Malin signed a record deal and in 2006 she released two albums. Malin på månen was released in May, a children's album that includes "Sommer og skolefri" and she participated in writing most of the original songs on it. Malin's jul is a Christmas album with familiar Christmas songs. Her third album Pang was released in April 2008, and was certified gold in a few weeks.

In October 2011, it was announced that Malin would compete in the adult version of Melodi Grand Prix in 2012. In the semi-final, she finished third and made it to the national final with the song "Crush".

Discography

Singles

References

 Malins melodi, TV documentary, (NRK1, 20 November 2005)
 http://www.nrk.no/programmer/tv/melodi_grand_prix_junior/mgp_jr/4650681.html

1995 births
Junior Eurovision Song Contest entrants
Living people
Norwegian child singers
Melodi Grand Prix Junior contestants
Norwegian pop singers
Norwegian singer-songwriters
Pop keyboardists
21st-century Norwegian singers
21st-century Norwegian women singers